Renato Valente was an Italian film actor who appeared in a mixture of lead and supporting roles during the 1940s and early 1950s.

Selected filmography
 The Beggar's Daughter (1950)
 Beauties on Bicycles (1951)
 Black Fire (1951)
 Destiny (1951)
 The Mysteries of Venice (1951)

References

Bibliography 
 Giacomo Gambetti. Vittorio Gassmann. Gremese Editore, 1999.

External links 
 

Year of birth unknown
Year of death unknown
Italian male film actors